L.P. Cookingham Institute of Urban Affairs used to be known as the Department of Public Affairs at the University of Missouri-Kansas City’s Bloch School of Business and Public Administration.

Named after Laurie Perry Cookingham, the institute promotes community building and development as a means to contribute to urban area revitalization through scholarship, practice and community engagement in the Kansas City area.

The U.S. Peace Corps have formed a partnership with the institute to strengthen the university's commitment to bring the expertise within the university and into the community.

References

External links
L.P. Cookingham Institute of Urban Affairs at UMKC
L.P. Cookingham Institute at Mid-America Regional Council
L.P. Cookingham Institute at WorldCat

University of Missouri–Kansas City